Microchaetina mexicana is a species of bristle fly in the family Tachinidae. It is found in North America.

Distribution
United States.

References

Dexiinae
Insects described in 1892
Diptera of North America
Taxa named by Charles Henry Tyler Townsend